The Ryerson & Burnham Libraries are the art and architecture research collection of the Art Institute of Chicago.  The libraries cover all periods with extensive holdings in the areas of 18th-, 19th- and 20th-century architecture and 19th-century painting, prints, drawings, and decorative arts.  A variety of materials important to scholarly research includes architects' diaries, correspondence, job files, photographs, sketchbooks, scrapbooks, articles, transcripts, and personal papers.

History
The Art Institute of Chicago's library collection commenced in 1879 as a service for students at the School of the Art Institute of Chicago and for members of the museum. Over time, two libraries developed: the Ryerson Art Library, named after trustee to the institute and great contributor to the library collection, Martin A. Ryerson; and the Burnham Library of Architecture, named after another trustee and nationally renowned, Chicago-based architect, Daniel Burnham.

The current libraries are a merger of the two collections. The collection that comprised 200 books in 1884 has grown over one hundredfold as the libraries continue to add about 10,000 new publications to the collection each year.

Reading Room
The libraries’ reading room is located just inside the Michigan Avenue entrance of the Museum, to the south of the grand staircase.

The original Ryerson Library consisted solely of the Franke Reading Room.  Design in the 1880s by Shepley, Rutan and Coolidge, the Franke Reading Room was built at the site of the building's original courtyard.

Elmer Garnsey designed the interior's decorative scheme and Louis Millet designed the central skylight. Both the interior and the stained glass ceiling fixture have been restored during the 1990s by the architect Johh Vinci, who was also responsible for work done on the Chicago College of Performing Arts.

Included in the design is the inscription of significant writers in art and architecture on entablatures that circle the reading room.  Throughout the space are artworks from the Art Institute's permanent collection. In alcoves surrounding reader workspace are shelves of reference books, indexes and select current periodicals.

Access to the Libraries
The Libraries are open to museum staff, members, volunteers, School of the Art Institute faculty and alumni, visiting curators and scholars, college and university students, faculty, and staff. Researchers who do not fall into any of the above categories may access the libraries, with a few restrictions. This is a noncirculating research library.

Visitors can access the Libraries' Catalog online. Also available through the website are images, finding aids to archival collections, and digitized special collections.

Selections from the archival image and text collections have been digitized and are searchable from the Ryerson & Burnham Libraries' website and Explore Chicago Collections.

The archives include records on the following:
 Daniel Burnham
 Bruce Goff
 Bertrand Goldberg
 Walter Burley Griffin and Marion Mahony Griffin
 Irving Penn
 Percier and Fontaine
 Louis Sullivan
 Mies van der Rohe
 Frank Lloyd Wright
 Century of Progress
 World's Columbian Exposition

References

External links
The Art Institute of Chicago: The Ryerson & Burnham Libraries
The Ryerson & Burnham Libraries: Archival Collections
Catalog

Research libraries in the United States
Libraries in Chicago
Rare book libraries in the United States
Special collections libraries in the United States
Archives in the United States
Libraries established in 1879
Art Institute of Chicago